Sheldon Munson Griswold (January 8, 1861 – November 28, 1930) was missionary bishop of Salina, now the Episcopal Diocese of Western Kansas and later served as the Bishop of Chicago in 1930.

Early life and education
Griswold was born on January 8, 1861, in Delhi, New York, the son of Walter Hanford Griswold and Ann Elizabeth Betts. He studied at the Union College and graduated with a Bachelor of Arts in 1882 and later a Master of Arts in 1885. He undertook studies and training at the General Theological Seminary and graduated in 1885. He was awarded a Doctor of Divinity by Union College in 1900 and another from General Theological Seminary in 1903.

Priesthood
Griswold was ordained a deacon in June 1885 and priest in November of the same year. He became rector of St Augustine's Church in Ilion, New York and remained there till 1888 when he became rector of Emmanuel Episcopal Church in Little Falls, New York. He served as rector of Christ Church in Hudson, New York from 1890 till 1902.

Bishop
Griswald was elected Missionary Bishop of Salina on October 23, 1902. He was consecrated on January 8, 1903, by Bishop William Croswell Doane of Albany. During his time in Salina worked to build up the church in Kansas and founded Christ Church Cathedral in Salina, Kansas. He also purchased the Bishop's residence and established St Barnabas' Hospital in Salina. He also enlarged and improved St. John's Military School. He also increased the number of churches in the missionary territory. On January 8, 1917, he was elected Suffragan Bishop of Chicago and in February 1930 was elected diocesan bishop. He was only Bishop of Chicago for a few months. He was a bishop associate of the Confraternity of the Blessed Sacrament.

Family
Griswold married Kate Maxwell van der Bogert on October 7, 1885. He was a cousin of both Frank Griswold and Alexander Viets Griswold, both Episcopal bishops.

External links 
 
Kansas Cyclopedia entry

1861 births
1930 deaths
American Episcopalians
People from Delhi, New York
Union College (New York) alumni
General Theological Seminary alumni
Episcopal bishops of Chicago
Episcopal bishops of Western Kansas